Renier of St Laurent (died 1188) was a twelfth-century Benedictine monk of St Laurent Abbey, Liège. He is known as a writer of theological and exegetical works, controversial and historical works, and numerous biographical and hagiographical works. Works by him are in Patrologia Latina and Monumenta Germaniae Historica.

The Triumphale Bulonicum is a chronicle and commemorates the siege of Bouillon Castle by Albero, prince-bishop of Liège, 17 August to 22 September 1141. It is based on eye-witness accounts.

References
Hubert Silvestre, Notes sur la "Vita Evracli" de Renier de Saint-Laurent. Contribution à l'histoire littéraire du XIIe siècle Liégeois, Revue d'histoire ecclésiastique, XLIV (1949), pp. 29–86
Hubert Silvestre, Renier de St.-Laurent et le déclin des écoles liégeoises au XIIe siècle, Miscellanea Tornacensia. Mélanges d'archéologie et d'hist. Congrès de Tournai 1949 (Bruxelles 1951), pp. 112–123
David Foote, Taming monastic advocates and redeeming bishops: the Triumphale and episcopal vitae of Reiner of St. Lawrence, Revue d'histoire ecclésiastique 91 (1996)
Article "Reiner von Lüttich", col. 1165 in Die deutsche Literatur des Mittelalters: Verfasserlexikon (2006), by Wolfgang Stammler, Karl Langosch, Kurt Ruh

Notes

External links
 PDF

1188 deaths
Belgian Benedictines
Chroniclers from the Holy Roman Empire
12th-century historians from the Holy Roman Empire
Year of birth unknown
12th-century Latin writers